Conrad Bastien McRae (January 11, 1971 – July 10, 2000) was an American professional basketball player who had a successful career in Europe, for teams in France, Italy, Greece and Turkey. He was also selected by the Washington Bullets, in the second round (38th pick overall) of the 1993 NBA draft.

High school
McRae attended Brooklyn Technical High School, where he excelled at basketball. He earned the nickname "McNasty", while playing in the Entertainers Basketball Classic in Harlem's Rucker Park. In high school, McRae was named PSAL High School All-City from 1986–89, selected to the 1989 McDonald's All-American Team, and participated in the Junior Olympics.

College career
McRae accepted a scholarship to Syracuse University, where he would play college basketball under head coach Jim Boeheim, with the Syracuse Orange. Though he did not immediately garner many minutes of playing time, his tenacity, athleticism, and defensive skills turned him into a second round NBA draft pick in 1993, by the Washington Bullets.  While he was at Syracuse, McRae became a member of Phi Beta Sigma fraternity (Theta Xi Chapter).

Professional career 
McRae moved on to play in Europe, eventually starring on several European clubs in Turkey, France, Italy and Greece. He helped Efes of Istanbul to win the FIBA Korać Cup of 1995–96, and also reached the Italian League's championship finals in the 1996–97 season, with Fortitudo Bologna. While in Europe, he accidentally scored in the wrong basket, after getting a poor night's sleep in his Parisian hotel room, due to what were described as "water problems." Though McRae never played in the NBA, he did play on home soil for the Fort Wayne Fury of the CBA, in 1994. In eight games played with the Fury, McRae averaged 8.6 points and 7.5 points per game.

In 1999, McRae signed a 10-day contract with the Denver Nuggets, but it was terminated after he fainted before a game.

Death
In the summer of 2000, McRae collapsed and died while running wind sprints during an Orlando Magic summer league practice at the University of California, Irvine. An autopsy failed to determine the cause of death, but McRae had a history of arrythmia.

See also
List of basketball players who died during their careers

References

External links
FIBA Europe Profile
TBLStat.net Profile

1971 births
2000 deaths
African-American basketball players
American expatriate basketball people in France
American expatriate basketball people in Greece
American expatriate basketball people in Italy
American expatriate basketball people in Turkey
American men's basketball players
Anadolu Efes S.K. players
Basketball players from New York City
Brooklyn Technical High School alumni
Centers (basketball)
Élan Béarnais players
Fenerbahçe men's basketball players
Fortitudo Pallacanestro Bologna players
Fort Wayne Fury players
Greek Basket League players
Lega Basket Serie A players
McDonald's High School All-Americans
Pallacanestro Trieste players
P.A.O.K. BC players
Parade High School All-Americans (boys' basketball)
Power forwards (basketball)
Sports deaths in California
Syracuse Orange men's basketball players
Washington Bullets draft picks
20th-century African-American sportspeople